Ari may refer to:

People and fictional characters
 Ari (name), a name in various languages, including a list of people and fictional characters
 Rabbi Isaac Luria (1534–1572), Jewish rabbinical scholar and mystic known also as Ari
 Ari (footballer, born 1980), Brazilian footballer
 Ari (footballer, born 1985), Brazilian-born naturalized Russian striker
 Ari (footballer, born 1986), Brazilian goalkeeper

Ari is a place.

Languages
Ari language (New Guinea), a Papuan language of the Trans–New Guinea family
Ari language (Ethiopia), an Omotic language of Ethiopia
 ari, ISO 639-3 code for the Arikara language, spoken by the Arikara people, mainly in North Dakota

Other uses
 Abbreviation for Aries (constellation)
 Ari Motorfahrzeugbau GmbH, German manufacturer of the 1920s Arimofa car
Perfume by Ariana Grande

See also
 ARI (disambiguation)
 Arrie (disambiguation)
 Arry (disambiguation)
 Ari Buddhism, the religious practice common in Burma prior to the eleventh century
 Arri, supplier of film equipment
 Arizona Cardinals of the National Football League
 Arizona Diamondbacks of Major League Baseball
 Arizona Coyotes of the National Hockey League